47North is a publishing imprint of Amazon Publishing, the publishing company of Amazon. It is the seventh imprint begun under the parent company Amazon Publishing, and publishes speculative fiction under three main genres: fantasy, science fiction, and horror. It launched in October 2011 with 15 initial books.

History and publishing formats 
In October 2011, Amazon Publishing announced its seventh imprint, 47North, named for the latitude of Seattle, where Amazon headquarters are. 47North is an imprint publishing novels and shorter stories in the fantasy, science fiction, and horror genres.

Some 47North works are released as Kindle Serials, a serial novel format where works are released in several episodes over a period of weeks. Readers purchase an ebook copy of the book once, and subsequent episodes are delivered at no additional cost. On the completion of the serial novel, it is re-released as a complete novel in ebook and print form.

List of notable authors 

Authors published via 47North include:

 Brett Battles
 Greg Bear
 Dana Cameron
 Dave Duncan
 Evan Currie
 Meg Elison
 Nicole Galland
 Lee Goldberg
 Kenneth Johnson (producer)
 Marko Kloos
 Mark Lawrence
 Seanan McGuire
 Scott Meyer
 William Rabkin
 Chris Roberson
 Ransom Stephens
 Neal Stephenson
 Mark Teppo

Submissions 
Amazon Publishing does not accept unsolicited manuscripts.

References

External links

Amazon (company)
American companies established in 2011
American speculative fiction publishers
Book publishing companies based in Washington (state)
Book publishing company imprints
Fantasy book publishers
Horror book publishing companies
Internet properties established in 2011
Online publishing companies of the United States
Science fiction publishers